Millennium Theatre may refer to:
 Millennium Theatre (Prague), Czech Republic
 Millennium Theatre, Limerick, Ireland
 Millennium Theatre, former name of Sight & Sound Theatres' theatre in Ronks, Lancaster County, Pennsylvania, USA
 Millennium Theater, former name of Master Theater, Brighton Beach, New York City

See also
 Millennium Forum, theatre in Derry, Northern Ireland
 Millennium Stage, John F. Kennedy Center for the Performing Arts, Washington, D.C.
 Wales Millennium Centre, theatre complex in Cardiff